Sathy Road, (NH 209) is a congested arterial road in city of Coimbatore, Tamil Nadu, India. It is a part of National Highway 209 between Coimbatore and Bengaluru. This road runs for about 7 kilometers starting exactly from the GP Signal, Gandhipuram up to the northern suburb of Saravanampatti.

Places transversed
 GP Signal, Gandhipuram
 Coimbatore Omni Bus Terminus
 Ganapathy
 Athipalayam Pirivu
 Sivananthapuram
 Saravanampatti Pirivu
 Saravanampatti

References

Roads in Coimbatore